The following is a list of episodes of the Idol Time PriPara anime television series. The first opening and ending themes are "Just be yourself" by The World Standard and "Idol:Time!!'" by Arisa Date and Himika Akaneya.

Episode list

References

Pripara
Idol Time PriPara